Dudley Guice Jr. (born May 28, 1986) is a former American football wide receiver and current Atlanta, Georgia police officer. He was signed by the Tennessee Titans as an undrafted free agent in 2009. He played college football at Northwestern State.

Guice also played for the Winnipeg Blue Bombers and the Indianapolis Colts. The Spokane Shock added Guice to the 2011 roster.

Early years
Guice was born in Fayette, Mississippi, and attended high school at Trinity Episcopal Day School in Natchez. He was an All-South State selection for the Trinity Saints.

He finished his collegiate career at Northwestern State with 78 catches for 1,213 yards and 11 TD.  As a Senior in 2008, he had 35 catches for 606 yards with 6 TD.

Professional career

Pre-draft
Before the draft, Guice played in the Texas vs. The Nation game and caught a 22-yard touchdown in a game described as a "standout performance".

He also had an impressive pro day workout running a 4.40 40 yard dash, jumping 39" in the vertical jump, jumping 10'5" in the standing broad jump, and running a 4.01 in the 20 yard shuttle and 6.61 in the 3 cone drill.

Tennessee Titans
Guice became an undrafted free agent for the Tennessee Titans. He went through the preseason before being waived prior to the start of the 2009 NFL season.

Winnipeg Blue Bombers
Guice signed with the Winnipeg Blue Bombers on September 11, 2009. He appeared in three games for the Blue Bombers as a rookie, catching six passes for 76 yards.

Indianapolis Colts
Guice signed a future contract with the Indianapolis Colts on January 6, 2010. He was waived August 28, 2010.

References

Resources
Official website 	
Just Sports Stats
Northwestern State Demons bio
Tennessee Titans bio
Winnipeg Blue Bombers bio

1986 births
Living people
People from Fayette, Mississippi
Players of American football from Mississippi
American football wide receivers
American players of Canadian football
Canadian football wide receivers
Northwestern State Demons football players
Tennessee Titans players
Winnipeg Blue Bombers players
Indianapolis Colts players
Spokane Shock players